The 2018 Commonwealth Games Queen's Baton Relay was run from 13 March 2017 until 4 April 2018, prior to the Gold Coast 2018 Commonwealth Games. The baton bearer selection process for the Australian segment was announced on 18 October 2017.

As well as touring Australia the schedule included the other 70 Commonwealth Nations.

Organisation 
The Queen's Baton Relay was launched on Commonwealth Day, 13 March 2017, on the historic forecourt at Buckingham Palace in London, signalling the official countdown to the start of the Games. Accompanied by the Duke of Edinburgh and Prince Edward, Her Majesty Queen Elizabeth II heralded the start of the relay by placing her 'message to the Commonwealth and its athletes' into the distinctive loop-design Queen's Baton which then set off on its journey around the globe. Her Majesty was accompanied by Louise Martin, President of the Commonwealth Games Federation (CGF), Peter Beattie, Chairman of the Gold Coast 2018 Commonwealth Games Corporation (GOLDOC) and Yugambeh elders Patricia O'Connor and Ted Williams in the ceremony. The Queen's baton was brought into the stage by Australian Paralympic champion Kurt Fearnley . He started from Marlborough House up The Mall and then into the Forecourt of Buckingham Palace. He was also accompanied by the Band of the Scots Guards, who played by permission of Major General BJ Bathurst, The Major General commanding the Household Division. After the message was placed safely inside the Baton, The Queen handed over the baton to Australian cyclist and Commonwealth and Olympic Games gold medalist Anna Meares. She, along with English track cyclist Victoria Pendleton, then carried the baton around the Queen Victoria Memorial and handed over to the Australian singer Cody Simpson. He then boarded on a Kombi van with the baton and left the place as an indication to the Baton's final destination, Gold Coast.

The baton travelled for 388 days, spending time in every nation and territory of the Commonwealth. The Gold Coast 2018 Queen's Baton Relay was the longest in Commonwealth Games history. Covering 230,000 km over 388 days, the baton made its way through the six Commonwealth regions of Africa, the Americas, the Caribbean, Europe, Asia and Oceania. For the first time in the history of the baton relay, the Queen's Baton was presented at the Commonwealth Youth Games during its sixth edition in 2017 which was held in Nassau, Bahamas. The baton landed on Australian soil on 24 December 2017 and then spent 100 days travelling through Australia.

The Queen's baton 

The Queen's baton for the 2018 Commonwealth Games had a distinctive loop design and was made of macadamia wood and recycled plastic sourced from Gold Coast waterways. Its design was inspired by the Queensland's "vibrant spirit and indigenous heritage" and with sustainability. The design of the baton was unveiled on 20 November 2016 at a special ceremony in the Jupiter Gold Coast Hotel. The baton was designed by Alex Wall and Warren Shroeder from the Brisbane-based firm Designworks. At the 2018 Good Design Awards conducted by the Good Design Australia, the baton won the Best Product Sport and Lifestyle award.

International route

Africa 
The Queen's Baton travelled in the following countries in Africa:

Caribbean 
The Queen's baton traveled in the following countries in the Caribbean:

Americas 
The Queen's baton traveled in the following countries in Americas:

Europe 
The Queen's baton traveled in the following countries in Europe:

Asia 
The Queen's baton traveled in the following countries in Asia:

Oceania 
The Queen's baton traveled in the following countries in Oceania:

National route

Australian Capital Territory 
The Queen's baton traveled in the following places in the Australian Capital Territory:

New South Wales 

The Queen's baton traveled in the following places in the New South Wales:

Tasmania 
The Queen's baton traveled in the following places in Tasmania:

Victoria 
The Queen's baton traveled in the following places in Victoria:

South Australia 
The Queen's baton traveled in the following places in South Australia:

Western Australia 
The Queen's baton traveled in the following places in Western Australia:

Northern Territory 
The Queen's baton traveled in the following places in the Northern Territory:

Queensland 

The Queen's baton traveled in the following places in Queensland:

End of Relay 
The end of the relay took place in the 2018 Commonwealth Games opening ceremony.

The Queen's baton was brought into the Carrara Stadium in a Kombi van by Australian former swimmer Susie O'Neill. She then went to the centre of the stadium and images and videos of popular Gold Coast attractions were projected on the ground of the stadium such as feeding lorikeets, skydiving, dreaming in the ocean, walking in the treetops, and riding the rollercoaster. After that, she handed over the baton to Australian former cyclist Brad McGee , who took it to Australian wheelchair racer Kurt Fearnley. Fearnley after parading it around the stadium, handed over to Australian netballer Liz Ellis, who then took it to Australian hockey player Brent Livermore. Finally, Brent handed the baton over to Australian hurdler Sally Pearson. She received a large applause from the audience as she lives in Gold Coast. She went to the dais along with the baton and hand it over to the CGF President Louise Martin. Martin removed the Queen's message from the baton and handed to Prince Charles. Charles read out the message and declared the competition officially open.

Sponsors 
Tourism Australia and QSuper sponsored the international and Australian segment of Queen's Baton Relay respectively, while Longines sponsored both the segments.

References 

2018 Commonwealth Games
Queen's baton relays